The three-tier ACC Premier League tournament has evolved from the former two-tier ACC Trophy cricket competition. The 2014–15 season started with top tier tournament which was held in Malaysia in May. It gives Associate and Affiliate members of the Asian Cricket Council experience of international one-day cricket and also helps form an essential part of regional rankings. Some of the individual matches were given One Day International (ODI) status by the International Cricket Council (ICC).

The top four teams of top-tier tournament, Afghanistan, UAE, Nepal and Oman qualified for the 2014 ACC Championship, while Hong Kong and Malaysia remained in the 2016 ACC Premier League. In the second division held in Singapore between 7–13 July, the host winning the tournament also qualified for the same tournament. Results of the ACC Premier League 2014 was determined on rankings in the final table. If two or more teams had equal points, rankings were decided by net run-rate.

Teams

Squads

Points table

Matches

Statistics

Most Runs
The top five run scorers (total runs) are included in this table.

Most Wickets
The top five wicket takers (total wickets) are listed in this table.

References

Asian Cricket Council competitions
International cricket competitions in Malaysia
ACC Premier League